Isaksen is a Norwegian surname. In 2015, there were 4,719 people with this surname in Norway. The name is a patronymic meaning 'son of Isak'.

Notable people with the surname include:
Alf Isaksen (born 1946), Norwegian Sami politician
Djóni Isaksen (a.k.a. Djóni í Geil; 1849–1912), Faroese politician
Dorothy Isaksen (born 1930), Australian politician
Espen Isaksen (born 1979), Norwegian soccer player
Eva Isaksen (born 1956), Norwegian film director 
Finn Isaksen (1924–1987), Norwegian politician
Geir Isaksen (born 1954), Norwegian businessperson
Hugo Isaksen (born 1976), Norwegian musician
Ingvild Isaksen (born 1989), Norwegian soccer player
Jógvan Isaksen (born 1950), Faroese writer and literary historian
Kim Isaksen (born 1973), Norwegian singer
Leif Isaksen (born 1928), Norwegian illustrator and cartoonist
Magnar Isaksen (1910–1979), Norwegian soccer player
Margaux Isaksen (born 1991), American pentathlete
Robin Isaksen (born 1977), Norwegian musician
Runo Isaksen (born 1968), Norwegian writer
Samuel Isaksen (born 1982), Norwegian soccer player
Torbjørn Røe Isaksen (born 1978), Norwegian politician
Trond Norén Isaksen (born 1981), Norwegian historian

References

Norwegian-language surnames